Sjaak Polak (born 18 February 1976 in The Hague) is a Dutch former footballer and current manager.

Club career 
An outspoken wingback and freekick specialist, Polak previously played for Excelsior Rotterdam, FC Twente, and ADO Den Haag. In May 2008, Sparta announced that they would not extend his contract. He joined Twente in January 2001 and went on to pick up a winner's medal when Twente won the 2001 KNVB Cup after a penalty shoot-out (in which he scored).

After that, Sjaak had several trials, in Austria for example with Austria Vienna and with Swiss club St. Gallen, but without success. He ended up in Israel on trial with Maccabi Tel Aviv. Maccabi was interested in Polak's services because of Jewish descent ), and would not count as a foreigner for the club, thanks to the Israeli Law of Return. Polak had trouble getting the necessary documentation proving his family's Jewish origins and when he was told that he would be asked to give up his Dutch citizenship, he decided to sign for BV Veendam back in his native the Netherlands.

Coaching career
After ending his career in 2012, Polak started his coaching career and was appointed as manager for four-division team RSV Hoekpolder.

In April 2014, Polak was appointed as manager for the reserve team of Quick Boys for the upcoming season. He stayed at the club for two seasons, before he was appointed at RKSV GDA. In November 2016, he was appointed manager of VV SJC for the 2017/18 season which meant, that he would continue at RKSV GDA until the end of the season. Due to disappointing results, Polak was fired on 23 April 2019.

Honours 
FC Twente
 KNVB Cup Winner 2000–01

External links
 Player profile – Sparta Rotterdam
 Career stats – Voetbal International

References

1976 births
Living people
Dutch footballers
Dutch expatriate footballers
Dutch football managers
Dutch Jews
Jewish Dutch sportspeople
Eredivisie players
Eerste Divisie players
Derde Divisie players
Association football defenders
ADO Den Haag players
Excelsior Rotterdam players
FC Twente players
Sparta Rotterdam players
SC Veendam players
RBC Roosendaal players
Expatriate soccer players in the United States
Dutch expatriate sportspeople in the United States
Footballers from The Hague
SVV Scheveningen players